Manzil Manzil is a 1984 Indian romantic drama film, directed by Nasir Hussain, with his nephew Aamir Khan as his assistant director. The film stars  Sunny Deol and Dimple Kapadia along with Danny Denzongpa, Kulbhushan Kharbanda, Prem Chopra and Asha Parekh.

Cast 
 Sunny Deol as Vijay / Sonu
 Dimple Kapadia as Seema Malhotra
 Arjun as Roopesh
 Prem Chopra as Niranjan Das
 Kulbhushan Kharbanda as Mr. Malhotra (Seema's Father)
 Danny Denzongpa as Gautam / Pahadi Baba (Vijay's Father)
 Asha Parekh as Vijay's Mother
 Tariq as Deepak

Soundtrack

References

External links 
 

1984 films
1980s Hindi-language films
Films directed by Nasir Hussain
Films scored by R. D. Burman